Artem Viktorovich Turov (born 1 March, 1984) is a Russian political figure and a deputy of the 6th, 7th and 8th State Dumas.
 
Turov was born in a family of the famous Belorussian filmmaker Viktor Turov and Soviet actress Svetlana Arkhipova. In 2002, while being in the second year of his BA program at the Smolensk State University, Turov joined the United Russia and the Young Guard of United Russia. In 2006, he was appointed head of the Smolensk branch of the Young Guard of United Russia. On December 2, 2007, he was elected deputy of the Smolensk Oblast Duma of the 4th convocation. In August 2012, he became chairman of the public council of the Young Guard of United Russia. On September 8, 2013, Turov was re-elected to the Smolensk Oblast Duma of the 5th convocation. On October 19, 2015, he was elected to the 6th State Duma. In 2016 and 2021, he was re-elected for the 7th and 8th State Dumas, respectively.

References
 

 

1984 births
Living people
United Russia politicians
21st-century Russian politicians
Eighth convocation members of the State Duma (Russian Federation)
Seventh convocation members of the State Duma (Russian Federation)
Sixth convocation members of the State Duma (Russian Federation)